In role-playing games, a campaign is a continuing storyline or set of adventures, typically involving the same characters.  The purpose of the continuing storyline is to introduce a further aspect into the game: that of development, improvement, and growth (or degeneration) of the characters. In a campaign, a single session becomes a scene or an act within an overall story arc. At its inception, a campaign may or may not have a defined conclusion. A campaign, by definition, spans multiple playing sessions. Some game aspects commonly remain constant throughout a campaign: the campaign setting, the players, and the gamemaster. The gamemaster for a campaign is said to run the campaign.

Aspects of a campaign 
A campaign is characterized by the following:
 Rules – What underlying game system is used?  What changes, additions, or subtractions has the game master made to the rules?  How will the game master interpret those rules?
 Setting – Where do the adventures take place?  What makes this world or place unique?
 Realism – Will the game try to closely simulate the real world?  Or will unlikely or fantastic happenings be commonplace?
 Humor – Will the game be silly or comical?  Or will it be serious and dark?
 Plot – Are the players a part of larger events? Not all campaigns have such a storyline, but most at least have recurring characters.

Differing emphasis on these factors sets the flavor of the campaign. A campaign, its characters, the settings, and its history, are created by players and the game master collaboratively .

Types of campaigns 
 A hack and slash, kick in the door, or dungeon crawl campaign focuses on slaying monsters and finding treasure. This type of campaign is often very episodic. Many players of Dungeons & Dragons favor this type of campaign.
 A wargame campaign focuses on military and political activities, generally involving the affairs of fictional states. Miniature wargaming overlaps with role playing. Games Workshop started as a roleplay company, but through an analogous process, have transformed themselves into a miniatures manufacturing company with support material for entire fictional worlds – all to support their own role/miniature campaign concepts.
 A four color or superheroic campaign resembles comic books. Players are often given tasks, such as stopping supervillains, by their superiors.
 A detective campaign focuses on mysteries that must be solved by the players or that unfold as the game goes along. These may be ordinary crimes or paranormal mysteries. Some games, such as Call of Cthulhu, are designed specifically with supernatural campaigns in mind.
 Numerous variants of the above campaigns are created by the players. The exact nature of these variations are usually exposed by providing a descriptive prefix to the word campaign. For example: a villain campaign where the players are the bad guys or a kiddie campaign where the players' characters are still children.

Other names 
Some published games have deliberately used different terms for the same concept. For instance, White Wolf uses the word Chronicle for its World of Darkness and Exalted games.

References 

Role-playing game terminology

ja:キャンペーン (TRPG)